Tawa Bowanle Ishola  (born 23 December 1988) is a Nigerian football midfielder who played for the Nigeria women's national football team at the 2008 Summer Olympics.

See also
 Nigeria at the 2008 Summer Olympics

References

External links
 
 profile at sports-reference.com
 

1988 births
Living people
Women's association football midfielders
Nigerian women's footballers
Place of birth missing (living people)
Nigeria women's international footballers
Olympic footballers of Nigeria
Footballers at the 2008 Summer Olympics
FC Minsk (women) players
Nigerian expatriate women's footballers
Nigerian expatriate sportspeople in Belarus
Expatriate women's footballers in Belarus
Bayelsa Queens F.C. players
Osun Babes F.C. players
 Yoruba people